Alive In South Africa is a live worship album by Israel & New Breed. Recorded on August 20, 2005 in Cape Town, South Africa, the disc was released on October 25, 2005 by Integrity Media. It is the fifth album by Israel, his fourth released by Integrity, and his third live album and serves as the follow-up to his 2004 album Live from Another Level.

Track listing

Disc 1 
 Intro- 2:07
 Alive Overture- 1:14
 Alive- 4:10
 Favor of the Lord- 3:53
 Favor of the Lord (Reprise)- 3:11
 Turn It Around- 5:31
 Not Forgotten- 5:58
 Not Forgotten (Reprise)- 3:19
 Not Forgotten (Slow Version)/He Knows My Name- 2:29
 Take the Limits Off- 2:00
 Take the Limits Off/No Limits (Enlarge My Territory)- 8:41
 Bishop Tudor Bismark (Speaking)- 2:56
 It's Raining- 7:43
 Surely- 4:54

Disc 2 
 Intro- 0:25
 Still Standing- 6:35
 I Will- 4:46
 African Skies (Instrumental)- 1:17
 You've Been A Friend- 4:50
 To Worship You I Live (Away)- 6:53
 Worship Medley- 5:41
 Alpha and Omega- 8:00 (written and composed by Erasmus Mutambira)
 Jonathan Butler Intro- 1:52
 Come and Let Us Sing (Featuring Jonathan Butler)- 7:31
 New Season- 2:49
 Your Latter Will Be Greater- 1:53
 You Are Good- 1:43
 Again I Say Rejoice- 1:12
 Friend of God- 4:46
 He Knows My Name (Bonus Cut)- 4:09
 Not Forgotten (Radio Version – Bonus Cut)- 5:51

Personnel

Band
Aaron Lindsey - Fender Rhodes, Piano, Hammond Organ, Programming
Arthur Strong - Fender Rhodes, Piano, Hammond Organ
Jerry Harris Jr. - Keyboards
Johnny Najara, Eric Brice - Guitar
Terrance Palmer - Bass
Michael Clemons - Drums
Tony Paco, Javier Solis - Percussion
Mike Haynes, Vaughn Fransch - Trumpet
Mark Douthit, Marc DeKock - Saxophone
Barry Green, Kelly Bell - Trombone

New Breed (Background Vocals)
Olanrewaju Agbabiaka
Dakri Brown
Mattie Calloway
Ryan Edgar
Daniel Johnson
Stacey Joseph
Melanie Scott
Danielle Stephens
Jamil Whiting

Charts

Awards 
Grammy Awards 

|-
|rowspan="2"|  ||rowspan="1"| Alive In South Africa || Best Traditional Gospel Album || 
|-
|"Not Forgotten" || Best Gospel Song || 

GMA Dove Awards 

|-
|rowspan="3"| 2006 ||rowspan="1"| Alive In South Africa || Praise & Worship Album of the Year || 
|-
|"Friend of God" || Song of the Year || 
|-
|"Not Forgotten" || Contemporary Gospel Recorded Song of the Year || 
|-
|rowspan="2"| 2007 ||rowspan="1"| Alive In South Africa || Long Form Music Video of the Year || 
|-
|"Turn It Around" || Contemporary Gospel Recorded Song of the Year ||

References 

Israel Houghton albums
2005 live albums